Luke Carty (born 24 September 1997) is an Irish born American rugby union player who currently plays for the Chicago Hounds in Major League Rugby (MLR). He also plays for the United States national rugby union team. He is the younger brother of Jack Carty who plays for Ireland. His grandmother was born in New York, allowing him to play for the United States.

He previously played for the LA Giltinis in the MLR.

Amateur career
Carty began playing rugby at Marist College in Athlone.

Professional career
Carty was selected for the Connacht A team in 2016 and played for the club in 2016, 2017 and 2018. He also played several seasons for the Buccaneers and was named as their Player of the Year in 2019. In 2021, he moved to the United States and signed with Major League Rugby team, the LA Giltinis.

International
Carty was selected for the Irish squad at the 2017 World Rugby Under 20 Championship as an injury replacement.

Carty debuted for the United States national team in July 2021, playing against England in the 2021 July rugby union tests.

Personal life
Luke Carty attended NUI Galway from 2016 to 2018, earning a Bachelor of Commerce Degree. He is currently attending Michael Smurfit Graduate Business School at University College Dublin working towards a Master's of International Business.

References

External links
itsrugby.co.uk Profile

1997 births
Living people
United States international rugby union players
Irish rugby union players
American rugby union players
Rugby union fly-halves
People from Athlone
Alumni of the University of Galway
Connacht Rugby players
LA Giltinis players
Chicago Hounds (rugby union) players